Pitești Arena is a multi-purpose arena located in Pitești, Romania.

See also
 List of indoor arenas in Romania

References
  

 
2022 establishments in Romania
Sports venues completed in 2022
Music venues completed in 2022 
Pitești
Basketball venues in Romania 
Indoor arenas in Romania
Sports venues in Romania 
Music venues in Romania
Sport in Pitești